Bernd H. Niehaus Quesada (born 14 April 1941) is a Doctor Summa Cum Laude in International Law from the University of Strasbourg (France). He completed human rights studies at the René Cassin Institute (France). He also obtained a Honoris Causae Doctorate from the Universidad Central del Este (Dominican Republic). He is attorney at law and notary public from the University of Costa Rica. He also studied economics and political science in Bonn, Hamburg and Koln Universities, Germany. His family is partly German and he holds both nationalities.

Quesada is Costa Rica's current ambassador to Germany, Hungary and the Czech Republic (2002-). He was also previously the Costa Rican ambassador to the United Nations Organization (1998–2002), and Minister of Foreign Affairs for the Government of Costa Rica (1980–1982 and 1990–1994). In 1994 he was a candidate for the general secretariat of the Organization of American States.

He has been a professor of public international law at the University of Costa Rica, a member of the Costa Rican Bar Association since 1974, and a member of the International Law Commission since 2002. He speaks Spanish, German, French and English.

References

Ambassadors of Costa Rica to Germany
Ambassadors of Costa Rica to Hungary
Ambassadors of Costa Rica to the Czech Republic
Permanent Representatives of Costa Rica to the United Nations
Living people
1941 births
International Law Commission officials
Foreign ministers of Costa Rica
Costa Rican officials of the United Nations
Members of the International Law Commission